Albert of Belgium may refer to:

 Albert I of Belgium (1875–1934), reigned as King of the Belgians from December 23, 1909, to February 17, 1934
 Albert II of Belgium (born 1934), his grandson, reigned as King of the Belgians from August 9, 1993, to July 21, 2013